Vishuddha Siddhanta Panjika is a panjika (almanac) that was first published in 1297 Bengali year (1890 AD).  Madhab Chandra Chattopadhyay of the Bengal of undivided India was the first editor.

Accuracy 
The 19th century Bengali almanacs that gave details of tithi, nakshatra, etc. were generally not in conformity with the position of planets. A true panjika has to tally with the scientific observation. To meet this end, prominent astrologers of that time — almanac reformist of Orissa Mahamahopadhyay Chandrashekhar Sinha Samanta, Lokmanya Bal Gangadhar Tilak of Pune, Western India, scriptural scholars like Bapudeva Sastri and Ketkar, experts from Kashi like Madan Mohan Malaviya, Mahesh Chandra Nyayratna Bhattacharyya, Sasadhar Tarkachudamani, Acharya Yogesh Chandra Roy Vidyanidhi of Bengal — advised the publication of Vishuddha Siddhanta Almanac.

Approval and adoption 
Vishuddha Siddhanta Almanac is recognized by scholars of scriptures such as Deshikottama Dr Srijiv Nyayaratna, mathematics scholar Nirmal Chandra Lahiri, internationally known scientist Prof Megh Nad Saha, et al.

This almanac is approved and followed by Kanchi matha, worldwide Ramakrishna Math and Ramakrishna Mission, Satsanga Ashrama of Deoghar and other religious organisations.

Rashtriya panchang 
The calculations of the almanac are fully done with the help of computers to show the accuracy of the renderings and, therefore, the timing of the puja and parvan  for occasions are free from any mistake. Hence the Indian national calendar (Rashtriya Panchang) published by the Government of India fully tallies with the almanac.

However, the traditional school also has its validity. Jyotish Shastra is not astronomy, and it is based on the words of Parashara, Garga, Mantreshwara who never used computers or western astronomy. Further, the planetary positions of Jyotish-nakshatra, rashi-or rahu, Ketu etc. depend more on belief and assumptions than science.

Contents
Vishuddha Siddhanta Panjika provides articles on astrology and astronomy; annual predictions for the nation on subjects ranging from agriculture to politics; predictions on individual lagnas; and annual predictions on the basis of birth-stars. There are other regular sections like vedic months and dates from the Indian national calendar.

Daily declination of the Sun, equation of time, sidereal time, planetary aspects, correct times of the eclipses, rising and setting times of the moon in different places, rising and setting times of the sun in Kolkata and seven other cities, monthly description of the night sky and locations of the stars and planets with explanatory sky maps are given. The dates of the main celebrations for the coming year are mentioned. An important addition is the dates of birth and death of many savants and saints of India irrespective of denominational adherence.

External links
 Bisuddha Siddhanta Panjika Software 5000 BC to 5000 AD for your PC and mobile
 Bengali calendar according Vishuddha Siddhanta Panjika following Indian Standard Time
 Bengali calendar according Vishuddha Siddhanta Panjika following Bangladesh Standard Time

Astrological almanacs
Hindu astrological texts
Panchangam

bn:বিশুদ্ধ সিদ্ধান্ত পঞ্জিকা
es:Calendario hindú
eo:Hinda kalendaro
fr:Calendrier sayana
it:Calendario hindu
pt:Calendário hindu
zh:印度曆